Max Starcke Dam is a dam in the U.S. state of Texas. Starcke Dam impounds Lake Marble Falls, one of the Texas Highland Lakes. The dam was constructed in 1949–1951 in order to provide hydroelectric power. Located near Marble Falls, Texas, Starcke Dam was the last of the six Highland Lakes dams to be built.

Originally called Marble Falls Dam, the dam was renamed in 1962 for Max Starcke, a former Mayor of Seguin, Texas. Starcke was also the second general manager of the Lower Colorado River Authority and served in that position from 1940 through 1955.

References

External links

LCRA Website

Buildings and structures in Burnet County, Texas
Dams in Texas
Lower Colorado River Authority dams
Hydroelectric power plants in Texas